Foindu is a village in Kono District in the Eastern Province of Sierra Leone. Virtually every home in the village was looted and burned during the Sierra Leone civil war.

References

Villages in Sierra Leone